Meginnis and Schaumberg was an architectural firm in Lincoln, Nebraska. The firm lasted from 1925 until 1943 when partner Harry Meginnis died. The firm designed several buildings listed on the National Register of Historic Places and three buildings on University of Nebraska's East Campus as well as the Mueller Tower on its City Campus.

History
Meginnis trained in his father's construction business and then worked for Dieman & Fiske with Ferdinand C. Fiske in Cedar Rapids, Iowa. Fiske hired Meginnis as a draftsman in his Lincoln office from 1901 until 1907. In 1907 Meginnis moved to Indianapolis and worked at various firms over several years including DuPont & Hunter (1907-1909); H.L. Bass Co. (1909-1914); and Broakie & Meginnis (1914-1915). 

The partnership of Fiske and Meginnis was established in 1915 and designed several buildings in Lincoln including several schools including: Prescott, Irving, Whittier, Clinton, and Elliot. 

Edward G. Schaumberg joined the firm as a partner in 1924 and it became Fiske, Meginnis, & Schaumberg in 1925. By 1926 the firm became Meginnis and Schaumberg.

Work
J.C. Ridnour building in the Haymarket District

Federal Trust Building at 13th and N
Federal Trust Building, 134 S. 13th St. Lincoln, NE Meginnis and Schaumberg NRHP listed
Remodel of the Lincoln Liberty Life Insurance Building at 11th and O. Art Deco style
Lincoln Liberty Life Insurance Building, 113 N. Eleventh St. Lincoln, NE Meginnis, Harry NRHP listed 
Antelope Grocery, 2406 J St. Lincoln, NE Meginnis, Harry NRHP listed
Lincoln YWCA Building, 1432 N St. Lincoln, NE Meginnis & Schaumberg NRHP listed 
Masonic Temple, 1635 L St. Lincoln, NE Meginnis and Schaumberg NRHP listed
Phi Kappa Tau Fraternity House, 5305 Huntington Ave. Lincoln, NE Meginnis, Harry NRHP listed
Strang School District No. 36, Main St. Strang, NE Meginnis & Schaumberg. NRHP listed
York City Auditorium (1940), an Art Deco building by Meginnis & Schaumberg

References

American companies established in 1925
1943 disestablishments in Nebraska
Defunct architecture firms based in Nebraska
Companies based in Lincoln, Nebraska
Design companies disestablished in 1943
1925 establishments in Nebraska
Design companies established in 1925